Tong Wun is a female former international table tennis player from Hong Kong.

Table tennis career
She won a bronze medal for Hong Kong at the 1995 World Table Tennis Championships in the Corbillon Cup (women's team event) with Chai Po Wa, Chan Tan Lui and Wan Shuk Kwan.

She also won a bronze medal during the 1998 Asian Games.

See also
 List of World Table Tennis Championships medalists

References

Hong Kong female table tennis players
Asian Games medalists in table tennis
Table tennis players at the 1998 Asian Games
Medalists at the 1998 Asian Games
Asian Games bronze medalists for Hong Kong
World Table Tennis Championships medalists
20th-century Hong Kong women